The Neoproterozoic Chuar Group consists of  of fossiliferous, unmetamorphosed sedimentary strata that is composed of about 85% mudrock. The Group is the approximate upper half of the Grand Canyon Supergroup, overlain by the thin, in comparison, Sixtymile Formation, the top member of the multi-membered Grand Canyon Supergroup.

The mudrock is interbedded with meter-thick sandstone and dolomite beds. The mudrocks are typically gray to black when freshly exposed and weather to reddish or greenish colors. The fresh gray to black colors of the mudrocks are due to a high organic content. Some samples of these mudrocks contain high total organic carbon percentages that are as much 9.39 weight percent organic carbon. The sandstone beds often exhibit symmetrical ripple marks. These ripple marks are commonly draped with a thin veneer of mudstone with mudcracks. These strata have been subdivided into the Galeros Formation (lower) and the Kwagunt Formation (upper) using the base of the prominent, thick sandstone unit.

The Chuar Group is quite fossiliferous. The dolomite beds are associated with at least six different types of either stromatolites or microbially influenced carbonate precipitation. The gray and black mudrocks often contain an abundance of microfossils, including vase-shaped microfossils (VSMs) likely presentative of arcellinid testate amoebae, acritarchs, "Sphaerocongregus variabilis", and organic chemicals characteristic of dinoflagellates. Finally, the enigmatic circular fossils of Chuaria circularis are found at various levels within the Chuar Group.

The types of fossils found and sedimentary strata comprising the Chuar Group are indicative of its deposition within a low-energy marine embayment. During the deposition of the Chuar Group, this embayment was influenced by tidal and wave processes, infrequent large storms, microbial activity and carbonate precipitation, and the accumulation of mud and organic matter in quiet water. The sediments and fossils suggest that the Chuar Group accumulated in relatively shallow water (tens of meters or less), possibly, with times of intermittent exposure on a tidal flat.

Geologic sequence of Grand Canyon Supergroup

The units of the Grand Canyon Supergroup: (1250 Ma to 700 Ma)
 4 – Sixtymile Formation (ends at ~700 Ma)
 3 – Chuar Group
 Kwagunt Formation
 Galeros Formation
 2 – Nankoweap Formation
 1 – Unkar Group
 5 – Cardenas Basalt, youngest, Meso-Proterozoic 1070 ± 70 million years
 4 – Dox Formation
 3 – Shinumo Quartzite
 (2B) – Diabase sills (Unkar Group)-(4 sills, 25 ft thickness max; sources of Cardenas Basalt)
 2 – Hakatai Shale
 1 – Bass Formation, (begins at ~1250 Ma)

See also
 Geology of the Grand Canyon area

References

Popular Publications
 Blakey, Ron and Wayne Ranney, Ancient Landscapes of the Colorado Plateau, Grand Canyon Association (publisher), 2008, 176 pages, 
 Chronic, Halka. Roadside Geology of Arizona, Mountain Press Publishing Co., 1983, 23rd printing, pp. 229–232, 
 Keller, B.; 2012; Overview of the Grand Canyon Supergroup; Grand Hikes; accessed .
 Lucchitta, Ivo, Hiking Arizona's Geology, 2001, Mountaineers's Books,

External links 
 Stratigraphy of the Parks of the Colorado Plateau. U.S. Geological Survey, Reston, Virginia.
 Sixtymile Formation
  Chuar Group of Grand Canyon Supergroup
 Kwagunt Formation
 Galeros Formation
 Nankoweap Formation
 Unkar Group of Grand Canyon Supergroup
 Mathis, A., and C. Bowman (2007) The Grand Age of Rocks: The Numeric Ages for Rocks Exposed within Grand Canyon, National Park Service, Grand Canyon National Park, Arizona.
 Share, J.  (2102a) The Great Unconformity of the Grand Canyon and the Late Proterozoic-Cambrian Time Interval: Part I – Defining It.
 Share, J.  (2102a) The Great Unconformity and the Late Proterozoic-Cambrian Time Interval: Part II – The Rifting of Rodinia and the "Snowball Earth" Glaciations That Followed.
 Timmons, M. K. Karlstrom, and C. Dehler (1999) Grand Canyon Supergroup Six Unconformities Make One Great Unconformity A Record of Supercontinent Assembly and Disassembly. Boatman's Quarterly Review. vol. 12, no. 1, pp. 29–32.
 Timmons, S. S. (2003) Learning to Read the Pages of a Book (Grand Canyon Geology Training Manual), National Park Service, Grand Canyon National Park, Arizona.

Grand Canyon
Geologic groups of Arizona
Neoproterozoic North America